Music Made Addictz is the debut album of Dutch hardstyle duo D-Block & S-te-Fan. The album was released under Scantraxx Records on September 28, 2009. The album featured 15 tracks and collaborations with artists such as Wildstylez and DJ Isaac.

Track listing
CD

Samplers
Four album samplers were released from Music Made Addictz. The samplers were released over the course of the months between October 2009 and December 2009. Album Sampler 1 was released on October 5. Sampler 2 was released on October 26, Sampler 3 was released on November 16, and the final Sampler was released on December 14. Samplers were released in 12" format and in digital download format. Each sampler contains the full version of the album tracks featured. The samplers were released under Scantraxx Evolutionz.

Sampler 1 track listing

Sampler 2 track listing

Sampler 3 track listing

Sampler 4 track listing

Notes
"Music Made Addict" was not featured on any album sampler because it was already released under Scantraxx Evolutionz in March 2009 under Scantraxx Evolutionz release 004. The song "Let It Go" is based on the melody of "Last of The Wilds" by the Finnish symphonic metal band, Nightwish, from their sixth album, Dark Passion Play.

References

2009 debut albums